The Funny Cide Stakes is an American Thoroughbred horse race for two-year-old horses bred in New York, approved by the New York State-Bred Registry, and run at Saratoga Race Course in Saratoga Springs, New York.  An ungraded stakes race, it is set at a distance of  furlongs on the dirt and currently offers a purse of $200,000.

Named for Funny Cide, the first New York bred horse to win the Kentucky Derby and the first gelding to win since Clyde Van Dusen in 1929, this race was first run on August 28, 2009.

In 2014, this race was part of the inaugural "Saratoga Showcase Day" featuring New York State bred horses.

In 2009 this race was set at 9 furlongs. After a gap, in 2014 it was restricted to two-year-olds bred in the state of New York.

Record 
Most wins by a jockey

 2 – John R. Velazquzez (2015, 2016)

Most wins by a trainer

 2 – Todd A. Pletcher (2015, 2016)
 2 – Christophe Clement (2019, 2021)

Most wins by an owner

 2 – Reeves Thoroughbred Racing (2019, 2021)

Past winners

References
 Saratoga Race Course
 Inaugural Funny Cide Stakes

Horse races in the United States
Ungraded stakes races in the United States
Saratoga Race Course
Recurring sporting events established in 2009
2009 establishments in New York (state)